Akulliq was a territorial electoral district (riding) for the Legislative Assembly of Nunavut, Canada.

The riding consisted of the communities of Kugaaruk and Repulse Bay. Kugaaruk is now a part of the Netsilik riding and Repulse Bay (which has since been renamed to Naujaat) is a part of the Aivilik riding.

Election results

1999 election

2004 election

2008 election
The 2008 election was delayed in Akulliq due to a legal challenge brought by former Member of Parliament Jack Anawak, who filed as a candidate but was rejected by Elections Nunavut because he had not lived in Nunavut for twelve consecutive months prior to the election. After Anawak's challenge was dismissed by the courts, a by-election was held on December 15, 2008, but only two votes separated incumbent MLA Steve Mapsalak and his main challenger, former Northwest Territories MLA John Ningark.

A judicial recount was conducted, but resulted in Ningark and Mapsalak each receiving exactly 157 votes, thus forcing a second election on March 2, 2009.

References

External links
Website of the Legislative Assembly of Nunavut

Electoral districts of Kitikmeot Region
Electoral districts of Kivalliq Region
1999 establishments in Nunavut
2013 disestablishments in Nunavut